Artemi Gavezou Castro (born 19 June 1994 in Thessaloniki, Greece) is a former group rhythmic gymnast, who also represented Spain.

Career 
Gavezou was born in Thessaloniki, Until 2013 she lived in Greece, where she trained and competed with the Greek team for almost 13 years. In 2013, she moved to Spain to study, where she resides permanently.

She competed at world championships, including at the 2015 World Rhythmic Gymnastics Championships where she won the bronze medal in the all-around event. She participated at the 2015 European Games in Baku.

Gavezou competed at the 2016 Summer Olympics in Rio de Janeiro, Brazil where she was member of the Spanish group (together with Elena López, Sandra Aguilar, Lourdes Mohedano, Alejandra Quereda) that won silver medal in group-all around.

Detailed Olympic results

References

External links
 

1994 births
Living people
Gymnasts from Thessaloniki
Greek people of Spanish descent
Spanish people of Greek descent
Spanish rhythmic gymnasts
Gymnasts at the 2015 European Games
European Games competitors for Spain
Medalists at the Rhythmic Gymnastics World Championships
Medalists at the Rhythmic Gymnastics European Championships
Olympic silver medalists for Spain